Grappes Bluff is an unincorporated community in Natchitoches Parish, Louisiana, United States. It was located nearby Louisiana 480.

References

Populated places in Ark-La-Tex
Unincorporated communities in Louisiana
Unincorporated communities in Natchitoches Parish, Louisiana